Brentwood I-64 is a St. Louis MetroLink station. Located on Eager Road in Brentwood, Missouri, just southeast of the Interstate 64/Interstate 170 interchange, it serves the large Brentwood Promenade shopping center and the Hanley Industrial Court industrial park.

The station includes 918 park and ride spaces in a parking garage with 22 additional long-term spaces. The ten story Brentwood Garage opened June 12, 2007 and replaced the 200 space temporary lot. The garage is shared by BJC HealthCare and is connected by a covered walkway accessible on the fourth floor. A bus transfer facility, MetroLink ticket booths, and retail space were also included in this project.

Station layout
The platforms can be accessed from the primary entrance at Musick Memorial Drive and two entrances along Hanley Industrial Court.

References

External links
 St. Louis Metro

MetroLink stations in St. Louis County, Missouri
Blue Line (St. Louis MetroLink)
2006 establishments in Missouri